Here is a list of the educational institutions of Mymensingh city, Bangladesh. The number registered has increased since the 1990s in proportion with the rising population.

Universities and colleges 

 Bangladesh Agricultural University 
 Jatiya Kabi Kazi Nazrul Islam University
 Mymensingh Medical College
 Govt. Muminunnesa Women's College
 Agricultural University College, Mymensingh
 Mymensingh Girls' Cadet College
 Community Based Medical College, BangladeTechnolog
 Ananda Mohan College
(Proposed) Bongobondhu Cultural University, Mymensingh
Mymensingh Women Polytechnic Institute
 Alamgir Monsur (Mintu) Memorial College, Mymensingh
 Notre Dame College, Mymensingh
 Mymensingh Engineering College
 College of Business Science & Technology (CBST)
 Border Guard School ang College, Mymensingh
 State Institute
 Mymensingh Nursing College
 Collectorate School and College
 Teachers Training College (TTC)
 Woman Teachers Training College
 Mymensingh Polytechnic Institute(MPI)
 Rumdo Institute of Modern Technology
 Nasirabad University College
 Cantonment Public School & College
 Mymensingh Govt. College
 Advanced Residential Model College
 Brahmaputra Residential Model College
 Shahid Syed Nazrul Islam College
 Mymensingh Islami Academi & College
 Prime Central College
 Mymensingh Mohila (Degree) College
 Mymensingh College/ Mohabiddaloy
 Shambhugonj GKP College, Mymensingh
 Mymensingh Commerce College
Advanced Residential Model College
 Royal Media College
 Haji Kashem ali College
 Muslim Girls High School and College
 Momenshahi Law College
 National Public College
 Florence Boys College
 Bir Muktijodda Principal Motiur Rahman Academy (School & College)
 Home Economics College
 Mymensingh Textile Engineering Institute
 Momenshahi Technical College, Mymensingh
 Skabo Textile Engineering & Polytechnic Institute, Mymensingh
 Mymensingh Ideal College
 Mymensingh City College
 Eden Girls College, Mymensingh
 Mohakali Girls School and College
 Government Physical Education College, Mymensingh
 Shahabuddin Degree College
 Begum Fazilatunnecha Mujib Government Mohila College
 Mymensingh Institute Science and Technology

Schools

Education research 

 National Academy for Primary Teachers' Education (NAPE)
 Bangladesh Institute of Nuclear Agriculture (BINA)
 Bangladesh Fisheries Research Institute
 The Institute of Radiation Genetics and Plant Breeding
 Veterinary Training Institute, Mymensingh

Bangladesh education-related lists
Lists of schools in Bangladesh